Threlkeld is a village and civil parish in the north of the Lake District in Cumbria, England, to the east of Keswick.  It lies at the southern foot of Blencathra, one of the more prominent fells in the northern Lake District, and to the north of the River Glenderamackin. The parish had a population of 454 in the 2001 census, decreasing to 423 at the Census 2011.

Overview
There was extensive Norse settlement in the area during the era of Viking expansion (790s-1066). Thraell was probably a reference to native Cumbrians subjugated by the incoming Norse.
Historically a part of Cumberland, Threlkeld formerly had its own railway station on the Cockermouth, Keswick and Penrith Railway, on the opposite side of the valley, next to the (closed) Threlkeld Quarry, at the foot of Clough Head. Today the railway line is a footpath and cycle track. Three rows of terraced houses, which used to accommodate the quarry workers, stand near the station. The Threlkeld Quarry and Mining Museum is open nearby and operates the  narrow gauge Threlkeld Quarry Railway for tourists to enjoy.

Two pubs are located opposite each other in the village: The Salutation and the Horse and Farrier. There is also a Coffee Shop, a vibrant Village Hall, and a small church, St Mary's, in the village.

From 1904 to 1958 High Row, Threlkeld was the site of the Blencathra Isolation Hospital, one of the first Sanatoria in England.  The hospital was eventually closed due to the fall in tuberculosis cases. From 1958 to 1972 it served as a long term stay home for the elderly.

See also

Listed buildings in Threlkeld
Threlkeld railway station

References

External links

 Cumbria County History Trust: Threlkeld (nb: provisional research only – see Talk page)
Threlkeld village website - Threlkeld Web is run for the Parish Council and runs alongside the "Beneath Blencathra" newsletter.
Threlkeld Village Hall website - Village Hall and Coffee Shop website
Threlkeld village website
Threlkeld Village - history and pictures from the Threlkeld CE Primary School website
Saddleback Slate - Threlkeld Quarry slate manufacturing company
Threlkeld Quarry & Mining Museum - official website
Cumbria Archives

 
Villages in Cumbria
Civil parishes in Cumbria
Eden District
United Kingdom